The Main Directorate for Traffic Safety of the Ministry of Internal Affairs of Russia (GUOBDD, or , ГИБДД, GIBDD), popularly known under its historical abbreviation GAI, is a federal law enforcement agency of Russia specializing in traffic policing. They are responsible for the regulation of traffic, investigating traffic accidents, and operating stop lights.

The Administration is part of the Public Security Service of the MVD. The Administration has patrol jurisdiction over all Russian highways and roads.

History
The GAI, short for State Automobile Inspectorate, was formed on July 3, 1936. The GAI was part of the NKVD and actively starts executing tasks: fighting accidents, developing technical standards of operation of vehicles, supervises the preparation and education of drivers. And also keep records of accidents, analyze their causes, accident attracts offenders to justice, manages the issuance of license plates, data sheets, search cars, hiding from the accident scene.

In 1961 it was merged with the Road Traffic Control Department.

During the Guerilla phase of the Second Chechen war, as well as during the Insurgency in the North Caucasus, traffic safety officers were regularly targeted by Pro-Ichkerian, and later Jihadist insurgents. They made up a large portion of the law enforcement and Russian government casualties, in addition to FSB, MVD, and ГУОООП members who were assassinated or otherwise killed in action.

After the dissolution of USSR, GAI was renamed GIBDD - General Administration for Traffic Safety. There were rumors from March 2017 that the GIBDD is about to be dissolved until December 2018, as part of Russian police reform and will merged into the patrol service of the police. The Minister of Internal Affairs denied those rumors.

Structure and organisation 

Roads Patrol Service (Дорожно-патрульная служба)
 Roads Inspection and Traffic organisation Service (Служба дорожной инспекции и организации движения)
 Inspection and registration (Служба технического осмотра и регистрации)
 Investigation Division vehicles (Подразделения розыска автотранспорта)

Other names
 Department for Ensuring Road Traffic Safety of MVD of Russia abbreviated as DOBDD, since 1994
 State Inspectorate for Road Traffic Safety abbreviated as GIBDD, since 2002
GAI, short for State Automobile Inspectorate, until 2011
 DPS, short for Road Patrol Service - a part of the GAI/GIBDD directly responsible for patrolling the streets

Heads of Administration 
 Vladimir Feodorov (1992-2002)
 Viktor Kiryanov (2003-2011)
 Vladimir Shvetsov (2011)
 Viktor Nilov (2011-2017)
 Mikhail Chernikov (2017-)

See also
Police of Russia
Militsiya
MVD

External links
Official page of the General Administration for Traffic Safety

References 

Government agencies established in 1936
Specialist law enforcement agencies of Russia
Ministry of Internal Affairs (Russia)
Ministry of Internal Affairs (Soviet Union)